Carlos Império Hamburger, better known as Cao Hamburger (born 27 February 1962), is a Brazilian film and television director, screenwriter, and producer. He is one of the creators of the Castelo Rá-Tim-Bum series of programs for children in the TV Cultura of São Paulo, along with Flávio de Souza, which gave origin to a successful movie with the same title. Castelo Rá-Tim-Bum was one of the most successful children shows to air in Brazil. He directed in 2006 another successful film, The Year My Parents Went on Vacation, partly based on his childhood memories.

Hamburger was also one of two creative directors for Rio's contribution to the 2012 Summer Olympics opening ceremony. He won twice the International Emmy Kids Awards of best series with the works Pedro & Bianca and Young Hearts: Embrace Diversity, in 2014 and 2019 respectively.

Biography
Hamburger is the son of physicists and University of São Paulo professors Ernst Wolfgang Hamburger, of Jewish-German origin, and Amélia Império Hamburger, of Italian origin. He has three sisters: Sônia, a film producer, Vera, an art director and Esther, a university professor. His brother Fernando is a photographer.

Filmography

Film

Television

References

External links

 

Living people
1962 births
Brazilian film directors
Brazilian people of Italian descent
Brazilian people of German-Jewish descent
Jewish Brazilian writers
Writers from São Paulo